Care2 is a social networking website that was founded by Randy Paynter in 1998. The goal of the site is to connect activists from around the world with other individuals, organizations and responsible businesses making an impact.

Overview
Care2 members create an online identity by filling out a profile with personal information, as in most social networking sites, but Care2 also asks for more information about its members' personal lives and involvement in activism. The social interactions on Care2 revolve around groups that connect people who care about similar political and environmental issues. Members also often participate in internet petitions and news articles posted by others.

Other Similar Sites 
Care2 is one of several online petition sites that offer users the ability to create free petitions for social change. Other popular sites in the same space include Change.org, the petition site iPetitions.com, and the internationally focused Avaaz.org. Each of these is among the leading communities for online activism and have created petitions with real impact.

History
Care2 has been used throughout the years to combat, through petitions, political, environmental and civil rights issues. Recently, Care2 was used by Broadway theatre playwrights and actors to petition Indiana's Religious Freedom Restoration Act.

Security breach
On December 28, 2011, hackers attacked, breached and accessed unencrypted password data on Care2 servers.

Website Change
In August 2019, Groups, Healthy Living and Causes, C2NN, eCards, and Care2 Connect were eliminated.

See also
 Click-to-donate site
 List of social networking websites
 Environmentalism
 Wiser.org

References

External links

Blog hosting services
American social networking websites
Click-to-donate sites
Benefit corporations
Internet activism
Internet properties established in 1998
American fundraising websites